HMS Kashmir (F12) was a K-class destroyer built for the Royal Navy during the 1930s, named after the princely state of Kashmir in British India.

Description
The K-class destroyers were repeats of the preceding J class, except that they were not fitted for minesweeping gear. They were powered by Parsons geared steam turbines, each driving one propeller shaft, using steam provided by two Admiralty three-drum boilers. The ship's complement was 183 officers and men.

The ships were armed with six 4.7-inch (120 mm) Mark XII guns in twin mounts, two superfiring in front of the bridge and one aft of the superstructure. For anti-aircraft (AA) defence, they had one quadruple mount for 2-pounder "pom-pom" guns and two quadruple mounts for the 0.5 inch Vickers Mark III anti-aircraft machinegun. The K-class ships were fitted with two above-water quintuple mounts for  torpedoes. The ship was fitted with two depth charge throwers and one rack for 20 depth charges.

Construction and career
Kashmir was laid down by Thornycroft in Southampton in October 1937, launched on 4 April 1939 and commissioned on 26 October 1939.

Kashmir was bombed and sunk on 23 May 1941 by German Stuka dive bombers belonging to StG 2 and led by Hubertus Hitschhold, south of Crete in position .

Notes

References

External links

 

J, K and N-class destroyers of the Royal Navy
Ships built in Southampton
1939 ships
World War II destroyers of the United Kingdom
World War II shipwrecks in the Mediterranean Sea
Maritime incidents in May 1941
Ships sunk by aircraft during the Battle of Crete
Naval magazine explosions
Ships sunk by German aircraft
Ships built by John I. Thornycroft & Company
Shipwrecks of Greece